The Green River Downtown Historic District is a  historic district in Green River, Wyoming that was listed on the National Register of Historic Places in 2009.  The district included 11 contributing buildings and one other contributing structure.

It includes the surviving portion of the original core area of Green River.

References

External links
 Green River Commercial District at the Wyoming State Historic Preservation Office

Historic districts on the National Register of Historic Places in Wyoming
National Register of Historic Places in Sweetwater County, Wyoming